John Mendham (died ca. 1394), of Canterbury, Kent, was an English politician.

Family
Mendham married a woman named Margaret, who died ca. 1395; they had one daughter.

Career
Mendham was a Member of Parliament for Canterbury in February 1388.

References

Year of birth missing
1390s deaths
14th-century births
People from Canterbury
English MPs February 1388